Lion of England may refer to the following:

 The lions in the Royal Arms of England
 The lion which appears as a supporter on the Royal Arms of England and of its successor states
 The Barbary lion, one of the national symbols of England
 British big cats, alleged big feline creatures living on the British Isles
 "Lion of England" statuary; see The Queen's Beasts
 The specific heraldic form "Lion of England"; see Attitude (heraldry) and Lion (heraldry)
 Richard Lionheart
 King Oswald of Northumbria

See also
 English lion (disambiguation)
 British Lions (disambiguation)
 England Lions (disambiguation)
 The Lion and the Unicorn
 Barbary lion
 European lion